Reality is a 2014 French-Belgian comedy-drama film written and directed by Quentin Dupieux. The film premiered in the Horizons section at the 71st Venice International Film Festival on August 28, 2014. It stars Alain Chabat, Jonathan Lambert, Élodie Bouchez, Eric Wareheim, John Glover and Jon Heder.

Plot
A wannabe director is given 48 hours by a producer to find the best groan of pain, worthy of an Oscar, as the only condition to back his film. Meanwhile, reality, dreams, and fiction repeatedly overlap.

Cast

 Alain Chabat as Jason Tantra
 Jonathan Lambert as Bob Marshall
 Élodie Bouchez as Alice Tantra
 Kyla Kenedy as Reality
 Eric Wareheim as Henri
 John Glover as Zog
 Jon Heder as Dennis
 Matt Battaglia as Mike
 Susan Diol as Gaby
 Bambadjan Bamba as Tony
 Patrick Bristow as Klaus
 Sandra Nelson as Isabella
 Carol Locatell as Lucienne
 Erik Passoja as Billie
 Jonathan Spencer as Blue
 Lola Delon as Zog's Assistant
 Roxane Mesquida as Awards Hostess
 Michel Hazanavicius as Award Presenter
 Brad Greenquist as Jacques
 Axelle Cummings as The Receptionist
 Brandon Gage as Serge
 Raevan Lee Hanan as Luci

Thomas Bangalter, husband of Bouchez and former member of Daft Punk, has an uncredited cameo in the film. He plays the patient in the dermatologist's waiting room.

Production

Music
The soundtrack consists of only the first five minutes of "Music With Changing Parts" by Philip Glass.

Reception

Critical reception
On review aggregator Rotten Tomatoes, the film holds an approval rating of 64% based on 25 reviews, with an average rating of 6.13/10. The French cinema site AlloCiné gave the film a rating of 3.6/5 stars based on 32 reviews.

References

External links 
 
 
 

2014 films
2014 comedy-drama films
2010s English-language films
2010s French-language films
French comedy-drama films
Belgian comedy-drama films
French satirical films
Films about filmmaking
Films directed by Quentin Dupieux
2010s satirical films
Belgian satirical films
English-language Belgian films
English-language French films
French-language Belgian films
2010s French films